Barbados is an island nation located in the eastern Caribbean (formerly spelt Barbadoes).

Barbados or Barbadoes may also refer to:

Places
Barbadoes Island (Pennsylvania), an island in the Schuylkill River located to the south of Norristown in Montgomery County, Pennsylvania
Barbadoes, a former name of Theodore Roosevelt Island, Washington, D.C.
Mártires de Barbados Stadium, a multi-use stadium in Bayamo, Cuba
Disney's Caribbean Beach Resort, a hotel with a themed area by the name of Barbados
New Barbadoes Township, New Jersey, a township in Bergen County, New Jersey
New Barbadoes Neck
Barbadoes Street, a major street in central Christchurch, New Zealand
Barbadoes Street Cemetery, Christchurch
Barbadoes Green, former name of Howard Park, Kilmarnock, Scotland, home of Kilmarnock FC
Barbadoes Hill, a location in the Wye Valley, northeast of Tintern, Wales.
United States Naval Facility, Barbados (1957–1979), a U.S. Navy facility once located at Harrisons Point, St. Lucy, Barbados.

People
Barbados Joe Walcott (1873–1935), also known as "The Barbados Demon", professional boxer
Barbados Slim, fictional character on the US-based television show Futurama
James George Barbadoes, ( 1796–1841), African-American, community leader, and abolitionist

Music
Barbados (band), a Swedish band who participated in Melodifestivalen several times
"Barbados" (Typically Tropical song), 1975
"Barbados" (Models song), 1985
Barbados (composition), a jazz blues composed by Charlie Parker

Ships
, a British frigate in service with the Royal Navy from 1943 to 1946
SS Manticos, a British heavy-lift ship originally named SS Empire Barbados

Other
Muscovado, a style of sugar also known as "Barbados"
 45597 Barbados, a British LMS Jubilee Class locomotive

See also 

Barbadian (disambiguation)
Bajan (disambiguation)
Barbuda (disambiguation)